Superior Municipal Airport  is a public use non-towered airport,  southwest of the central business district of the city of Superior in Pinal County, Arizona, United States.

Although most U.S. airports use the same three-letter location identifier for the FAA, IATA, and ICAO, Superior Municipal Airport was assigned only E81 by the FAA.

Facilities and aircraft 

For the 12-month period ending April 22, 2017, the airport had 200 aircraft operations (an average of 0.6 per day) that were 100% general aviation. No aircraft were based there during that time.

References

External links 
 Superior Municipal Airport (E81) at Arizona DOT airport directory
 

Airports in Pinal County, Arizona